If We All Were Angels is a 1936 German comedy film directed by Carl Froelich and starring Heinz Rühmann, Leny Marenbach and Lotte Rausch.  The overall plot was similar to that of The Virtuous Sinner (1931) which Rühmann had also appeared in. It was made at the former National Studios in Berlin while location filming took place around Cologne. The film's sets were designed by the art director Franz Schroedter. It was re-released in 1950 by Herzog Film.

Synopsis
A respectable member of provincial German society nearly becomes involved in a scandal following a series of misunderstandings.

Cast
 Heinz Rühmann as Christian Kempenich
 Leny Marenbach as Hedwig - seine Frau
 Elsa Dalands as Selma Kempenich - die Tante
 Lotte Rausch as Maria, the maid
 Harald Paulsen as Enrico Falotti - Gesangslehrer
 Hanns August Herten as Bügermeister
 Charlotte Krause-Walter as Else
 Carl de Vogt as Hotel Porter 'Waldfrieden'
 Will Dohm as Police Inspector
 Paul Mederow as District Judge
 Ernst Waldow as Prosecution lawyer
 Hugo Froelich as Justizrat Genius - Defence lawyer
 Luise Morland as Frau Oberpostdirektor

References

Bibliography

External links 
 

1936 films
Films of Nazi Germany
German comedy films
1936 comedy films
1930s German-language films
Films directed by Carl Froelich
Films based on German novels
Films based on works by Heinrich Spoerl
German black-and-white films
Tobis Film films
1930s German films